3. deild karla or D3 is the fourth tier basketball competition among clubs in Iceland. It is organized by the Icelandic Basketball Federation.
It consists of 8 teams and the season consists of a schedule of 14 games. The top four teams meet in a playoff for the victory in the 3. deild. The two finalists achieve promotion to 2. deild karla.

History

Creation

3. deild karla originated in 2015 and consists of 10 teams. On 13 March 2020, the 2019–20 season was postponed due to the COVID-19 outbreak in Iceland. The day after, the Icelandic Basketball Federation canceled the rest of the season. The 2020–21 season was initially postponed in October after another outbreak of COVID-19 in the country. In January 2021 it was announced that the season would start on 13 February but with Hamar-b having withdrawn from the league.

Teams
The current 3. deild karla teams for the 2020–21 season are:

Source

Champions

Notes

Titles per club

References

External links
 KKÍ
3. deild karla – kki.is

2015 establishments in Iceland
3
Ice
Sports leagues established in 2015
Professional sports leagues in Iceland